Pisgah is an unincorporated community located in Tazewell County, Virginia.

References

Unincorporated communities in Tazewell County, Virginia
Unincorporated communities in Virginia